Badajoz Airport  is an airport located  east of Badajoz, a city in Extremadura, Spain, and  west of Mérida, Spain, the capital of the same Autonomous Community. The airport is connected with both cities by the Autovía A-5 motorway. The airport shares its runway and control tower with the Talavera la Real Air Base, an air base of the Spanish Air and Space Force, named for the nearby municipality of Talavera la Real.

Airlines and destinations
The following airlines operate regular scheduled and charter flights at Badajoz Airport:

Statistics

References

External links 
 Official website
 

Airports in Extremadura
Buildings and structures in Badajoz
Airports established in 1951